Venus Bay Conservation Park is a protected area located on the west coast of Eyre Peninsula in South Australia immediately west of the town of Venus Bay.  It consists of land on the Weyland Peninsula on the south side of Venus Bay, land on the north west side of the bay to the west of the town of Port Kenny and the seven islands located within the bay.  The conservation park was originally proclaimed to protect ‘important feeding and breeding grounds for many native birds’.  The conservation park is classified as an IUCN Category VI protected area.

References

External links
    Venus Bay Conservation Park official webpage
Venus Bay Conservation Park webpage on protected planet

Conservation parks of South Australia
Protected areas established in 1976
1976 establishments in Australia